Dos Idolos (Eng.: Two Idols) is a compilation album released by Marco Antonio Solís and Pepe Aguilar on September 27, 2005.

Track listing

External links
Marco Antonio Solís Official website
Pepe Aguilar Official website
 Dos Idolos on Amazon.com

Pepe Aguilar albums
2005 compilation albums
Marco Antonio Solís compilation albums
Univision Records compilation albums